Amazon Air (often branded as Prime Air) is a cargo airline operating exclusively to transport Amazon packages. In 2017, it changed its name from Amazon Prime Air to Amazon Air to differentiate themselves from their Amazon Prime Air autonomous drone delivery service. However, the Prime Air logo remains on the aircraft. Until January 2021, the airline had relied on wet-leasing its aircraft from other operators, but going forward it is looking to directly own some aircraft. On the planes the airline owns, the airline will still rely on others for CMI (crew, maintenance, and insurance) leases.

History 

In late 2015, Amazon began trial cargo runs out of Wilmington Air Park under the code name Project Aerosmith. In December 2015, Amazon announced that it would begin its own cargo airline to expand its capability.

In March 2016, Amazon acquired options to buy up to 19.9 percent of Air Transport Services Group's (ATSG) stock and began scheduled operations with 20 Boeing 767 aircraft.

On January 31, 2017, Amazon announced that Amazon Air would make Cincinnati/Northern Kentucky International Airport (KCVG) its principal hub, and began operations on April 30, 2017. Amazon received $40 million in tax incentives and plans to begin construction on a  facility with a  sorting facility and parking space for over 100 cargo aircraft; the project is estimated to cost $1.5 billion.

In December 2017 the company, which was named Amazon Prime Air, announced its rebranding as Amazon Air to avoid confusion with the Amazon Prime Air drone delivery service, although it continues to operate under the callsign "Prime Air".

As of June 2018, Amazon Air had 20 of its 33 cargo planes based at the Cincinnati/Northern Kentucky International Airport (KCVG), with the rest flying point-to-point transit routes across the United States. Amazon Air was to move into office space at the former Comair headquarters by March 2018.

Amazon leased 10 additional Boeing 767-300 planes from ATSG in December 2018.

Amazon has completed a new regional air hub at Fort Worth Alliance Airport (KAFW) and does not airlift third-party packages. The new regional hub began operating on October 2, 2019.

For 2019 and 2020, Amazon has committed to leasing 10 additional 767-300 aircraft from Air Transport Services Group, which would bring active aircraft to a total of 50.  Phase one of the CVG sort facility, encompassing  is scheduled for completion in 2020, while the remaining  will be developed by 2025–2027 during phase two. Amazon eventually plans to have over 100 aircraft based at CVG with over 200 daily flights and 15,000 employees.

In July 2020, Amazon Air had secured up to six million gallons of sustainable aviation fuel (SAF) supplied by Shell Aviation and produced by World Energy.

In September 2020, Amazon committed to buy four aircraft under their own operations. These are the first aircraft the company will own rather than lease. The four 767-300 aircraft were previously under the ownership of WestJet, who purchased them from Qantas in 2015. In January 2021, with passenger air traffic severely depressed and cargo traffic higher due to the COVID-19 pandemic, Amazon announced it had completed the purchase of 11 Boeing 767-300s from Delta Air Lines and WestJet.

In March 2021, Amazon exercised its warrants to acquire a minority stake in Air Transport Services Group, the parent company of Amazon Air sub-lessor Air Transport International. The deal was valued at $131 million for 13.5 million shares in the company. Amazon also holds warrants to acquire a minority stake in Atlas Air Worldwide Holdings, the parent company of Atlas Air.

In January 2023, Amazon launched Amazon Prime Air in India in partnership with QuikJet. The service will use two branded Boeing 737-800 freighters to deliver goods in four metro cities: Delhi, Mumbai, Hyderabad, and Bengaluru. The company plans to increase the number of dedicated freighters in India to six by the end of 2023, and will also continue to utilize the cargo space of other passenger airlines.

Operation 
The primary function of Amazon Air is to transport Amazon packages from distant fulfillment centers that are outside of Amazon's local ground linehaul network for a specific area. Once the buyer's order is flown from the distant fulfillment center to the buyer's region, the package may be transported to the regional Amazon Sortation Center to be routed either to a local Amazon Logistics Delivery Station for last mile delivery or to a local post office for delivery by the United States Postal Service. Some Amazon Air packages bypass the regional Amazon Sortation Centers completely and are routed directly to local Amazon Delivery Stations for last mile delivery by Amazon Logistics.

Destinations 
Amazon Air flies scheduled flights to the following destinations:

Fleet 
Amazon Air uses ATR 72, Boeing 737 and Boeing 767 aircraft, all of which are operated by contracted partners. As of August 2022, the Amazon Air fleet consists of the following aircraft.

Accidents and incidents 

 On February 23, 2019, Atlas Air Flight 3591 (a Boeing 767-300BCF, operating for Amazon Air) crashed into Trinity Bay near Anahuac, Texas. The aircraft was operating a regularly scheduled trip from Miami International Airport to George Bush Intercontinental. All three people on board (two crew members and one passenger) were killed.

References

Further media 
 Videos

External links 

Amazon Prime plane

Amazon (company)
Cargo airlines of the United States
Emerging technologies
American companies established in 2015
Airlines established in 2015